Gaston Tissandier (November 21, 1843 – August 30, 1899) was a French chemist, meteorologist, aviator, and editor. He escaped besieged Paris by balloon in September 1870. He founded and edited the scientific magazine La Nature and wrote several books.

His brother was illustrator Albert Tissandier. His son Paul became a well known aviator in his own right.

Biography
[[File:Elktroluftschiff.jpg|thumb|Gaston & Albert Tissandier in their electrically powered dirigible', 8 October 1883 at Auteuil in Paris]]

Gaston Tissandier was born in Paris in 1843. He studied chemistry and in 1864 became the head of the experimental laboratory of Union nationales. He was also a teacher at Association polytechnique. His interest in meteorology led him to take up aviation.

In September 1870, during the Franco-Prussian War, he managed to leave the besieged Paris by balloon.

His most adventurous air trip took place near Paris in April 1875. Both of his companions died from breathing the thin air. Tissandier survived, but became deaf.

In 1883, Tissandier fit a Siemens electric motor to an airship, thus creating the first electric-powered flight.

Tissandier reported his meteorological observations to the French Academy of Sciences. In 1873 he founded the weekly scientific magazine La Nature, which he edited until 1896, after which it was continued by others. He also authored several books:

 Works 
 Eléments de Chimie (1870)
 L'Eau (1867)
 La Houille (1886)
 Histoire de mes ascensions récit de quarante voyages aériens (1868-1886) (1887; German edition 1872)
 En ballon! Pendant le siège de Paris. Souvenirs d'un aéronaute (1871)
 Les Merveilles de la photographie (1874)
 Histoire de la gravure typographique (1875)
 Simples notions sur les ballons (1876)
 A history and handbook of photography (La photographie, 1873)
 Le Grand Ballon captif à vapeur de M. Henry Giffard (1879)
 Les Martyrs de la science (1879)
 Observations météorologiques en ballon. Résumé de 25 ascensions aérostatiques (1879)
 Les ballons dirigeables: Application de l'électricité à la navigation aerienne; [Ouvrage accompagné de 35 fig. et de 4 pl. hors texte] (1885)
 La photographie en ballon, avec une table (1886)
 Histoire des ballons et des aéronautes célèbres (1890)
 La Tour Eiffel de 300 mètres: description du monument, sa construction, ses organes mécaniques, son but et son utilité. Avec une lettre autographie de G. Eiffel (1889)Bibliographie aéronautique: Catalogue de livres d'histoire, de science, de voyages et de fantaisie, traitant de la navigation aérienne ou des aérostats (1887)

Besides these scientific works, Tissandier also published several titles for the youth, such as Les récréations scientifiques ou l'enseignement par les jeux (1880), perhaps the very first title in the genre of books of simple science experiments that anybody can conduct in their own home. Its chapters were in part based on the column "physique sans appareils" (physics without apparatus) in La Nature''.

See also 
List of years in aviation
 List of French inventions and discoveries
 French space program

References

This text is based in part on articles from old public domain encyclopedias in German and Swedish.

External links 
La Nature, complete year runs 1873–1905, digitized by Conservatoire National des Arts et Métiers, Paris
Tissandier Collection from the Library of Congress.  Drawings, prints, and photographs by and collected by Gaston and Albert Tissandier.
 
 
 Gaston and Albert Tissandier Collection: Publications relating to the history of aeronautics, (1,800 titles dispersed in the collection). From the Rare Book and Special Collections Division at the Library of Congress
Tissandier, Gaston (1887) Histoire des balons et des aéronautes célèbres - digital facsimile from the Linda Hall Library

1843 births
1899 deaths
Scientists from Paris
Burials at Père Lachaise Cemetery
French aerospace engineers
French balloonists
Airship designers
19th-century French chemists
French meteorologists